Khari Lee (born January 16, 1992) is an American football tight end who is a free agent. He played college football at Bowie State.

Professional career

Houston Texans
Lee was signed by the Houston Texans as an undrafted free agent in 2015.

Chicago Bears
Lee was traded from the Texans to the Bears for a sixth round pick in the 2017 NFL Draft on September 2, 2015. On September 4, 2016, Lee was waived by the Bears.

Detroit Lions
Lee was claimed off waivers by the Detroit Lions on September 6, 2016. He was released by the Lions on November 8, 2016 and was signed to the practice squad. He signed a reserve/future contract with the Lions on January 9, 2017.

On September 2, 2017, Lee was waived by the Lions.

Buffalo Bills
On September 3, 2017, Lee was claimed off waivers by the Buffalo Bills.

On October 6, 2018, Lee was waived by the Bills.

DC Defenders
In October 2019, Lee was drafted in the fifth round in the 2020 XFL Draft by the DC Defenders. Despite being best utilized as a blocker during his NFL career, Lee caught all eight of his targets, turning those eight receptions into 91 yards and two touchdowns in the shortened five-game 2020 season. 

On March 12, 2020, the XFL canceled the remainder of the 2020 season and allowed its players to sign with NFL teams. Lee was placed on the reserve/other league list on March 25, 2020. He had his contract terminated when the league suspended operations on April 10, 2020. During his time in the XFL, Pro Football Focus named Lee as its highest graded tight end.

Atlanta Falcons
On March 25, 2020, Lee signed a one-year deal with the Atlanta Falcons. On September 3, 2020 he was released with an injury settlement.

Detroit Lions (second stint)
On November 4, 2020, Lee was signed to the Detroit Lions practice squad. He was released on November 10.

References

External links
Chicago Bears bio
Bowie State Bulldogs bio

1992 births
Living people
Players of American football from Baltimore
American football tight ends
Bowie State Bulldogs football players
Houston Texans players
Chicago Bears players
Detroit Lions players
Buffalo Bills players
DC Defenders players
Atlanta Falcons players